General Sir Henry Fane  (26 November 177824 March 1840) commanded brigades under Arthur Wellesley, 1st Duke of Wellington during several battles during the Peninsular War, and served both as a member of Parliament and Commander-in-Chief of India.

Origins
He was the eldest son of Hon. Henry Fane (d.1802), of Fulbeck Hall, Lincolnshire, younger son of Thomas Fane, 8th Earl of Westmorland.

Military career

Fane joined the 6th Dragoon Guards as a cornet in 1792 and served as aide-de-camp to the Lord Lieutenant of Ireland, John Fane, before obtaining a lieutenancy in the 55th Regiment of Foot. He was promoted to captain-lieutenant in the 4th Dragoons in 1795; to major the following year and to lieutenant-colonel in 1797, subsequently serving throughout the rebellion that year. On 1January 1805, following his removal to the lieutenant-colonency of the 1st King's Dragoon Guards, he was appointed aide-de-camp to King George III, which made him a colonel in the army.

Peninsular War

As a brigadier general, Fane commanded a brigade in Wellesley's army at the Battle of Vimeiro in August 1808. His brigade, which included the 1/50th West Kents, 5/60th Royal Americans, and four companies of the 2/95th Rifles, took a key part in repelling the French frontal attacks on Vimeiro village.

During Sir John Moore's expedition in Spain, Fane commanded the 2nd Brigade (1/38th 1st Staffordshire, 1/79th Cameron Highlanders, 1/82nd Prince of Wales Volunteers Foot) in Alexander Mackenzie Fraser's 3rd Division. The 3rd Division was present but not engaged at the Battle of Corunna in January 1809.

Fane missed the Second Battle of Porto, since his heavy cavalry brigade (3rd Prince of Wales Dragoon Guards, 4th Queen's Own Dragoons) was guarding the Portuguese frontier at Abrantes. While commanding the same brigade, he fought at the Battle of Talavera in July 1809.

On 13 May 1810, Fane transferred to command a brigade that included the 13th Light Dragoons and four Portuguese mounted regiments. He was present at the Battle of Bussaco, while attached to Rowland Hill's 2nd Division. He went home ill before the end of 1810.

On 24 April 1813, Fane was promoted to major general on the staff. Posted to command a brigade consisting of the 3rd Dragoon Guards and the 1st Royal Dragoons on 20 May, he fought at the Battle of Vitoria in June. In that battle, his cavalry fought with Hill's Right Column, being lightly engaged.

During late 1813, Wellington sent most of his cavalry to the rear since they were almost useless in the rough terrain of the Pyrenees. In January 1814, Fane transferred to lead a brigade that included the 13th and 14th Light Dragoons. There is evidence that Fane effectively commanded both his old and new brigades in the final battles in southern France. Wellington called his cavalry forward in February, his light cavalry arriving first. Fane's brigade fought at the Battle of Orthez and was present at the Battle of Toulouse in April.

For his Peninsula service, Fane was awarded the Army Gold Cross with one clasp for the battles of Vimeiro, Corunna, Talavera, Vitoria, and Orthez.

Later career

He was made a KCB in 1815 and a GCB in 1826. Fane sat as MP for Lyme Regis in 1802–1816, MP for Sandwich in 1829–1830 and MP for Hastings in 1830–1831. He was named Commander-in-Chief of India in 1835.

He died on 24 March 1840, aged 61. His tomb in Fulbeck was designed by Edward Hodges Baily.

Mistress and illegitimate issue
Fane formed a "strong attachment" to Isabella Gorges, a daughter of Hamilton Gorges, and since 1791 the wife of Edward Cooke, described in his will as "of Avon" (i.e. Avon Tyrrell, Sopley, Hampshire). From 1801 Fane and Mrs Cooke lived together as man and wife, and had six illegitimate children, of which three survived infancy:

Col. Henry Fane (1802–1836), life tenant of Fulbeck Hall, Lincolnshire, under the will of his father. Started his military career as Capt. 4th Regiment, Dragoon Guards. Three of his sons were surviving in 1880.
Isabella Fane (1804–1880), spinster. Her letters from India, while acting as her father's hostess between 1835 and 1838, are described as "corrective to the notion that all Englishwomen in India were of the straight-laced memsahib type – snobbish, imperious and racially prejudiced".
Rev. Arthur Fane (1809–1872), vicar of Warminster, Wiltshire 1841–1859 and later appointed rector of Fulbeck by his father. Educated at Exeter College, Oxford. Married Lucy Bennett, daughter and heiress of John Benett MP of Pyt House, Wiltshire, and Boyton Manor, Wilts. Six children surviving in 1880. Appointed Prebendary of Salisbury. Served as domestic chaplain to his cousin the Earl of Westmorland. His grandson Major Henry Nevile Fane (1883–1947), Coldstream Guards (son of his third son Sir Edmund Douglas Veitch Fane (1837–1900) KCMG) married Hon. Harriet Trefusis (d.1958), daughter and senior co-heiress of Charles Hepburn-Stuart-Forbes-Trefusis, 21st Baron Clinton(d.1957). Major Henry Fane's grandson (by his son Capt. Charles Nevile Fane) was Gerard Nevile Mark Fane, who assumed the additional surname of Trefusis following the death of his grandmother Harriet, and became 22nd Baron Clinton in 1965, having claimed the termination of the 1957 abeyance of that title.

References

 Glover, Michael. The Peninsular War 1807–1814. London: Penguin, 2001. 
 Oman, Charles. Wellington's Army, 1809–1814. London: Greenhill, (1913) 1993. 

 Smith, Digby. The Napoleonic Wars Data Book. London: Greenhill, 1993. 
 Zimmermann, Dick. "Battle of Vimeiro," Wargamer's Digest magazine, vol 10, no 12, October 1983.

Footnotes

External links 
 

1840 deaths
1778 births
1st King's Dragoon Guards officers
4th Royal Irish Dragoon Guards officers
British Army personnel of the Napoleonic Wars
British Army generals
Knights Grand Cross of the Order of the Bath
Members of the Parliament of the United Kingdom for English constituencies
UK MPs 1802–1806
UK MPs 1806–1807
UK MPs 1807–1812
UK MPs 1812–1818
UK MPs 1826–1830
UK MPs 1830–1831
Recipients of the Army Gold Cross
Henry